Oleg Vyacheslavovich Shteynikov (born 11 July 1985 in Almaty) is a male freestyle swimmer from Kazakhstan, who competed for his native country at the 2004 Summer Olympics in Athens, Greece. There he ended up in 55th place in the men's 50m freestyle event.

References
 sports-reference

External links
 

1985 births
Living people
Kazakhstani male freestyle swimmers
Swimmers at the 2004 Summer Olympics
Olympic swimmers of Kazakhstan
Sportspeople from Almaty
Swimmers at the 2002 Asian Games
Asian Games competitors for Kazakhstan
Islamic Solidarity Games medalists in swimming
Islamic Solidarity Games competitors for Kazakhstan
21st-century Kazakhstani people